Squatting in Kazakhstan is the occupation of unused land or derelict buildings without the permission of the owner. From the 1980s onwards, migration has brought many people to Almaty who end up living in shanty towns. When the authorities attempted to evict the Shanyrak informal settlement in the mid-2000s it resulted in a riot and one person died.

History 

Under the 1977 Constitution of the Soviet Union, housing was guaranteed for every citizen, with internal migration controlled by the need for a propiska (permit) to live and work somewhere. When Kazakhstan became a republic in its own right in 1991, the ethnic Kazakhs were under 40 per cent of the total population and the right to housing became a political issue for nationalists. A new housing code was established in 1992.

By the 1980s, large numbers of people had a propiska to live in Almaty, but had not been allocated an apartment. Almaty (then Alma-Ata) is Kazakhstan's largest city and was also at that time the capital. In 1987, 500,000 people were waiting for apartments across the country and 20,000 in Almaty. Therefore the Zhiloy-91 housebuilding program was announced and self-building was also encouraged. Two years later, activists founded the organization Asar (meaning "co-operation" in the Kazakh language), which squatted derelict apartments and also demanded homes for ethnic Kazakhs. The procedure to buy land and construct a dwelling legally is lengthy, so people often build their home first then attempt to legalize it. Corruption (known as blat) is rife amongst the officials who can distribute title to land. In 2021, the authorities announced that satellite observation had determined there were 400,000 examples of squatters across the country. This situation were blamed upon corrupt officials selling off land illegally or making false documents.

Shanyrak 

In the 1990s, the Alma-Ata Union of the Homeless recommended to squatters that they should occupy unused land, summer homes or derelict buildings, and around 28 sites were occupied. When Kazakhstan grew wealthy through oil sales, the Almaty administration announced development schemes and planned to demolish shanty towns where people were living without running water in order to build luxury housing. The authorities began to evict squatters in Bakay and Shanyrak in 2006, although 80 per cent of residents had been issued with legal titles to their land. Poet Aron Atabek, who was chairman of Shanyrak's Land and Dwelling Committee, wrote to the wife of the president saying "Why not show some humanity and philanthropy, and legalise these miserable 0.06-hectare plots for these Kazak families for whom these pieces of land are the only way to survive in an environment of unchecked capitalism?".

In July, hundreds of people were evicted from their shacks in Bakay and a week later the police came to Shanyrak. Knowing that the threat of eviction was imminent, 1,500 residents decided to resist and in the ensuing conflict, four policemen were taken hostage. Three were released and the other was covered in petrol and set alight, later dying of his injuries. Order was only restored when 600 more police arrived and the following year, 23 men were sentenced for their participation in the riot. The 23 included Aron Atabek, who was jailed for 18 years. Whilst in prison, he wrote a book criticising President Nursultan Nazarbayev  and his administration called The Heart of Eurasia which was smuggled out and published in 2012. In consequence, Atabek was placed in solitary confinement, leading to protests from PEN International. Atabek would continue on serving his prison sentence before being released in October 2021; shortly afterwards he was hospitalised and died from COVID-19.

Nazarbayev ordered that the homes were legalized, but by 2010 this had still not happened. A new program was established in 2012, called Affordable Housing 2020, only to become embroiled in a fresh corruption scandal. Most of the Shanyrak squatters remained in place and attempted to storm a council meeting in 2010, wanting to protest at how long their claims for land tenure were taking.

References

Further reading 
 

Kazakhstan
Protests in Kazakhstan
History of Kazakhstan